Neo-völkisch movements may refer to:

Post-1945 attempts to revive the völkisch movement
A term for certain underground currents in far-right politics, used in the book Black Sun by Nicholas Goodrick-Clarke
Including: Esoteric Nazism, belief in Nazi UFOs, the Order of Nine Angles, Christian Identity, the World Church of the Creator and Wotansvolk

See also
 Far-right subcultures
 Occultism and the far right (disambiguation)